Chemoradiotherapy (CRT, CRTx, CT-RT) is the combination of chemotherapy and radiotherapy to treat cancer. Synonyms include radiochemotherapy (RCT, RCTx, RT-CT) and chemoradiation. It is a type of multimodal cancer therapy. 

Chemoradiation can be concurrent  (together) or sequential (one after the other).

The chemotherapy component can be or include a radiosensitizing agent.

Chemoradiotherapy as neoadjuvant therapy before surgery has been shown to be effective in esophageal cancer.

References

Further reading

External links
 Chemotherapy and chemoradiotherapy for rectal cancer. (Macmillan/NHS)

Radiation therapy